The Heidi Chronicles is a 1988 play by Wendy Wasserstein. The play won the 1989 Pulitzer Prize for Drama.

Production history
A workshop production at Seattle Repertory Theatre was held in April 1988, directed by Daniel J. Sullivan, starring Lizbeth MacKay, Caroline Aaron, and Gretchen Corbett.

The play premiered Off-Broadway at Playwrights Horizons on November 18, 1988 and closed on February 19, 1989 after 99 performances. It then transferred to Broadway at the Plymouth Theatre, opening on March 9, 1989 and closing on September 1, 1990, after 622 performances. Both productions were directed by Sullivan. The set design was by Thomas Lynch, costume design by Jennifer von Mayrhauser and lighting design by Pat Collins. The cast starred Joan Allen as Heidi, Boyd Gaines as Peter, and Peter Friedman as Scoop. Sarah Jessica Parker was featured in three small roles off-Broadway; those roles were played by Cynthia Nixon for the Broadway run.

Replacement actors on Broadway included Christine Lahti, Brooke Adams, and Mary McDonnell as Heidi,  David Hyde Pierce as Peter, and Tony Shalhoub as Scoop.

Two Broadway Heidis married the actor who played opposite them as Scoop:  Joan Allen and Peter Friedman (now divorced) and Brooke Adams and Tony Shalhoub.

The first major production mounted after Wasserstein's death in January 2006 was at the Berkshire Theatre Festival in August and September 2006, featuring Kate Jennings Grant.

On September 30, 2011, produced by The English Theatre of Rome and directed by Gaby Ford, the play premiered in Italy, at Rome's Teatro dell'Arciliuto near Piazza Navona, to wide acclaim.

A revival began Broadway previews on February 23, 2015, at the Music Box Theatre. The cast featured Elisabeth Moss in the title role, Bryce Pinkham as Peter Patrone and Jason Biggs as Scoop Rosenbaum, directed by Pam MacKinnon. The play opened officially on March 19. The production was originally scheduled to play through August 9, 2015 but closed on May 3 due to low ticket sales.

Synopsis
The plot follows Heidi Holland from high school in the 1960s to her career as a successful art historian more than twenty years later. 

The play's main themes deal with the changing role of women during this time period, describing both Heidi's ardent feminism during the 1970s and her eventual sense of betrayal during the 1980s. 

Though most of the characters are women, there are two important male characters; Peter Patrone, a gay pediatrician who is arguably Heidi's best friend, and Scoop Rosenbaum, a magazine editor who marries and has many affairs, and with whom Heidi has a tense friendship. Heidi meets Scoop at a Eugene McCarthy rally where he tries to woo her with knowledge and wit. She seems unenthused, but she realizes Scoop is a very intelligent, attractive man despite his egotistical ways. Although their romantic relationship is unsuccessful, the chemistry between Scoop and Heidi is undeniable, and they become lifelong friends. 

Heidi realizes that remaining unmarried does not mean she cannot be a mother, and she chooses to adopt a child on her own.

Critical responses and cultural impact
The New York Times critic Mel Gussow wrote of the Playwrights Horizon production: "Ms. Wasserstein has always been a clever writer of comedy. This time she has been exceedingly watchful about not settling for easy laughter, and the result is a more penetrating play. This is not to suggest, however, that The Heidi Chronicles is ever lacking in humor."

Film adaptation 

In 1995, the play was adapted as a television film. It was directed by Paul Bogart and starred Jamie Lee Curtis and Tom Hulce in the leading roles.

Awards and nominations

Original Broadway production (1989)

Broadway revival (2015)

References

External links

 
 
 

1988 plays
American plays adapted into films
Broadway plays
Drama Desk Award-winning plays
New York Drama Critics' Circle Award winners
Off-Broadway plays
Plays by Wendy Wasserstein
Plays set in Chicago
Plays set in Michigan
Plays set in New Hampshire
Plays set in New York City
Pulitzer Prize for Drama-winning works
Theatre in New York City
Tony Award-winning plays